Then There Were Three also known as Three Came Back  is a 1961 black and white Italian war film produced and directed by as well as co-starring Alex Nicol with Frank Latimore and Barry Cahill.

Plot summary
During the Italian campaign the Germans scheme to assassinate an Italian partisan leader held by the Americans. They infiltrate an English speaking assassin dressed in American uniform who joins a group of stragglers making their way to the village where the partisan leader is. During their journey the German infiltrator eliminates the American soldiers one by one.

Cast

 Frank Latimore as Lt. Willotsky
 Barry Cahill as Sgt. Travers
 Alex Nicol as Pvt. Sam McLease
 Frederick R. Clark as Calhoun
 Sidney Clute as Pvt. Ben Harvey
 Brendan Fitzgerald
 Michael Billingsley as Pvt. T.I. Ellis
 Frank Gregory as Pvt. Harry Miller
 Gérard Herter as the German Colonel

References

External links 
 

1961 films
Italian Campaign of World War II films
Macaroni Combat films
English-language Italian films
1960s English-language films
1960s Italian films